Girisha Hosanagara Nagarajegowda (born 26 January 1988), also known as Girish N. Gowda is paralympic high jumper from India. He was born with a disability in the left leg. He represented India in the 2012 Summer Paralympic games held in London in the men's high jump F-42 category and won the silver medal in the finals with a jump of 1.74 meters using scissors technique. He became the first Indian to win a medal at that event.[1] and the 8th Indian to win a medal at the Paralympics.[2]

Nagarajegowda is supported by Sports Academy of India For Differently abled, a Bangalore   He is also supported by "Karnataka Sports Association for Physically Handicapped" in Bangalore. He had taken part in the three-week training camp at Basildon Sporting Village sponsored by the Government of India before the games.[2]

Early success
Girisha's first taste of success was when he won a prize at the State-level sports meet in Dharwad when he competed with normal sportsmen. He then won a bronze medal at the Mysore University sports meet. He then won the gold medal at the national high jump championship. His first achievement at the international level came when he won a bronze at the Junior World Championships for the disabled in Ireland in 2006. This was followed by Gold medals in athletic meets in Kuwait and Malaysia.

Sponsorship
He was made the brand ambassador of nutrition company Herbalife International.

He was made the brand ambassador of election commission of karnataka.2017 and 2019

Awards
 2012 "Rajyotsava Award" by the Government of Karnataka
 2013 Padma Shri, India's fourth highest civilian award from the Government of India.
 2014 Arjuna Award by President of India
 2013"Ekalavya" Award by government of Karnataka in 2013
 2012"Best sports man State Award" by Disabled welfare department Govt of Karnataka

References

External links
Girisha Hosanagara Nagarajegowda profile page at london2012.com

Athletes (track and field) at the 2012 Summer Paralympics
Athletes from Karnataka
People from Hassan district
People from Dharwad
Kannada people
Living people
1988 births
Recipients of the Padma Shri in sports
Recipients of the Arjuna Award
Paralympic athletes of India
Medalists at the 2012 Summer Paralympics
Paralympic silver medalists for India
Recipients of the Rajyotsava Award 2012
Paralympic medalists in athletics (track and field)
Indian male high jumpers